is a private junior college in Kita, Tokyo, Japan. The precursor of the school was founded in 1925, and it was chartered as a university in 1965.

External links 
  in Japanese

Private universities and colleges in Japan
Educational institutions established in 1925
Universities and colleges in Tokyo
Japanese junior colleges
1925 establishments in Japan